The 2010 season of Úrvalsdeild was the 99th season of top-tier football in Iceland. It was also known as Pepsideild for sponsoring reasons. It began on 10 May 2010 and ended on 25 September 2010. Breiðablik won their first title, winning the championship on goal difference. Newly promoted sides Haukar and Selfoss were relegated to 1. deild.

Teams and venues

League table

Results
Each team play every opponent once home and away for a total of 22 matches.

Top goalscorers

14 goals
  Atli Viðar Björnsson (FH)
  Alfreð Finnbogason (Breiðablik UBK)
  Gilles Daniel Mbang Ondo (Grindavík)

13 goals
  Halldór Orri Björnsson (Stjarnan)

12 goals
  Kristinn Steindórsson (Breiðablik)

10 goals
  Guðjón Baldvinsson (KR Reykjavík)

9 goals
  Tryggvi Guðmundsson (ÍBV Vestmannaeyjar)
  Jóhann Þórhallsson (Fylkir)

8 goals
  Ívar Björnsson (Fram Reykjavík)
  Kjartan Henry Finnbogason (KR Reykjavík)
  Arnar Gunnlaugsson (Haukar)
  Albert Brynjar Ingason (Fylkir)
  Almarr Ormarsson (Fram Reykjavík)

Source ksi.is

Annual awards
As chosen by Úrvalsdeild players in 2010.

 Player of the year: Alfreð Finnbogason (Breiðablik)
 Young player of the year: Kristinn Steindórsson (Breiðablik)
 Manager of the year: Ólafur Helgi Kristjánsson (Breiðablik)
 Referee of the year: Gunnar Jarl Jónsson
 Fair play team of the year: Breiðablik
 Fair play player of the year: Fjalar Þorgeirsson
 Supporters of the year: Selfoss

Team of the Year 

 Goalkeeper: Ingvar Þór Kale (Breiðablik)
 Defence: Kristinn Jónsson, Elfar Freyr Helgason (both Breiðablik), Jón Guðni Fjóluson (Fram Reykjavík), James Hurst (ÍBV Vestmannaeyjar)
 Midfield: Ólafur Páll Snorrason (FH), Kristinn Steindórsson, Jökull Elísabetarson (both Breiðablik),  Baldur Sigurðsson (KR Reykjavík)
 Attack: Alfreð Finnbogason (Breiðablik), Atli Viðar Björnsson (FH)

See also
2010 in Icelandic football

References

External links
 Official website 

Úrvalsdeild karla (football) seasons
1
Iceland
Iceland